Motorcycle Diaries or The Motorcycle Diaries may refer to:

 The Motorcycle Diaries (book), a 1952 memoir by Che Guevara, first published in 1995
 The Motorcycle Diaries (film), a 2004 film based on Guevara's memoir
The Motorcycle Diaries (soundtrack), the soundtrack from the above movie
 Motorcycle Diaries (film), an upcoming Indian film, unrelated to Guevara
 Motorcycle Diaries (TV program), a documentary show produced by GMA Network from 2011 to 2017

See also
 Corbyn the Musical: The Motorcycle Diaries, a 2016 musical written by journalists Rupert Myers and Bobby Friedman